Neuburg am Rhein is a municipality in the district of Germersheim, in Rhineland-Palatinate, Germany. It is the southernmost municipality in the state.

Personalities 

 Ferdinand von Malaisé (1806-1892); Bavarian General and educator of King Ludwig III of Bavaria, grew up in Neuburg

References

Germersheim (district)